The Great Rift Valley is a series of connected geographic valleys from Lebanon to Mozambique.

Great Rift Valley may also refer to:

 Great Rift Valley, Ethiopia, branch of the East African Rift that runs southwest through Ethiopia
 Great Rift Valley, Kenya, part of the Gregory Rift that runs north to south through Kenya

See also
 Rift valley (disambiguation)
 East African Rift